Sop Mae Kha is a tambon (subdistrict) of Hang Dong District, in Chiang Mai Province, Thailand. In 2020 it had a total population of 2,479 people.

Administration

Central administration
The tambon is subdivided into 5 administrative villages (muban).

Local administration
The whole area of the subdistrict is covered by the subdistrict administrative organization (SAO) Sop Mae Kha (องค์การบริหารส่วนตำบลสบแม่ข่า).

References

External links
Thaitambon.com on Sop Mae Kha

Tambon of Chiang Mai province
Populated places in Chiang Mai province